This article contains a list of passenger trains in Bangladesh.

Inter-city

Commuter and mail

References 

 
Passenger trains